AS de Vacoas-Phoenix is a Mauritian football club based in Vacoas-Phoenix. They play in the Mauritian League, the top division in Mauritian football.

Ground
Their home stadium is Stade George V (cap. 6,200), located in Curepipe, Plaines Wilhems District. They share this stadium with Curepipe Starlight SC.

Achievements
Mauritian FA Cup: 1
2010

Mauritian Republic Cup: 1
2006

Mauritian Millennium Cup: 1
1999/00

Performance in CAF competitions
CAF Champions League: 1 appearance
2000 – Preliminary Round

CAF Confederation Cup: 1 appearance
2009 – First Round

External links
Official Site
YouTube Channel
zerozerofootball Profile

References

Vacoas-Phoenix
Football clubs in Mauritius
2000 establishments in Mauritius